The Century Building Society was a building society based in Edinburgh, Scotland. The Century Building Society merged with its local rival Scottish Building Society on 1 February 2013.

Prior to its merger with the Scottish Building Society, the Century Building Society was the smallest building society in Scotland and the United Kingdom, based on total assets of £22 million at 31 December 2007. It had only one branch, at its head office in Albany Street, Edinburgh. It was a member of the Building Societies Association.

History

The society was established in 1899 as The New Edinburgh Investment Building Society. The name was changed to Century Building Society in 1946. It also owns Theoutlets to provide insurance and financial services.

References

External links
 Century Building Society
 Building Societies Association
 KPMG Building Societies Database 2008

Former building societies of the United Kingdom
Banks established in 1899
Banks disestablished in 2013
1899 establishments in Scotland
2013 disestablishments in Scotland
British companies disestablished in 2013
British companies established in 1899